Mangka Town is a rural town in Cangyuan Va Autonomous County, Yunnan, China. This area is inhabited by Han, Wa and Dai people.

Name
The word Mangka is transliteration in Dai language. "Mang" means stockaded village and "Ka" means thatch.

History
On June 18, 1941, The Banhong Village and its western area are classified into Burma territory.

On January 25, 1960, China and Burma sign bilateral boundary division agreements, the boundary of the two countries was determined.

In 1984, Nanla District was established.

In 1988, it was incorporated as a township.

In 2002, it was upgraded to a town.

In 2013, the Huguang Village was listed among the second group of Chinese traditional villages.

Administrative division
As of 2017, the town is divided into 9 villages: Manggang Village, Haiya Village, Koumeng Village, Nanla Village, Laipian Village, Baiyan Village, Huguang Village, Jiaoshan Village and Nanjing Village.

Geography
The lowest point is the river mouth of Nanding River.

The Nanding River and Xiaohei River, tributaries of the Nu River, flow directly through the town.

Economy
The town's main industries are agriculture, mining and ranching. The mineral resources here are gold, silver, lead, zinc and sulphur.

Education
The town has ten primary schools and one middle school.

Transportation
The Nancang Road passes across the town.

The town is connected to the G30 Linqing Expressway.

References

Divisions of Cangyuan Va Autonomous County